The Hawaiian garden eel (Gorgasia hawaiiensis) is an eel in the family Congridae (conger/garden eels). It was described by John Ernest Randall and James Robert Chess in 1980. It is a marine, tropical eel which is known from the Hawaiian archipelago (from which its species epithet is derived), in the eastern central Pacific Ocean. It is non-migratory, and is thought to be restricted to the region.

This eel appears during sunrise and returns to its burrow around sunset, making it a diurnal animal. Although burrows of this eel are more abundant in shallow water, larger burrows belonging to this eel can be found in deeper water. 

The Hawaiian garden eel's diet consists of zoobenthos.

References

Gorgasia
Fish of Hawaii
Taxa named by John Ernest Randall
Taxa named by James Robert Chess
Fish described in 1980